Moorella perchloratireducens  is a thermophilic, anaerobic, Gram-positive and endospore-forming bacterium from the genus Moorella, which has been isolated from an underground gas storage tank in Russia. One of the main characteristics of this microorganism is that it is able to completely reduce chlorate and perchlorate to chloride and oxygen.

References

 

Thermoanaerobacterales
Bacteria described in 2008
Thermophiles
Anaerobes